The Nika Award for Best Director is given annually by the Russian Academy of Cinema Arts and Science and presented at the Nika Awards.

In the following lists, the titles and names in bold with a light blue background are the winners and recipients respectively; those not in bold are the nominees.

Winners and nominees

1980s

1990s

2000s

2010s

2020s

Multiple wins and nominations

Multiple wins

Four or more nominations

References

External links
 

Nika Awards
Awards for best director
Lists of films by award